Millfield is a public school (English fee-charging boarding and day school for pupils aged 13–18) located in Street, Somerset, England. It was founded in 1935.

Millfield is a registered charity and is the largest co-educational boarding school in the UK with approximately 1,200 students, of whom over 900 are full boarders of over 70 nationalities. Millfield Development and the Millfield Foundation raise money to fund scholarships and bursaries.  The school is a member of the G20 Schools Group and a member of the Headmasters' and Headmistresses' Conference.  The Millfield campus is based over 240 acres in Somerset, in and around Street, in the South West of England.

Millfield has its own pre-prep and preparatory school, Millfield Preparatory School (also known as Edgarley) in nearby Glastonbury, which takes children from 2 to 13 years old.  The prep school shares some of Millfield's facilities. It acts as a feeder school, with over 90% of its pupils typically moving up to Millfield each year.

History 
Millfield was founded in 1935 by Jack Meyer (referred to at Millfield as "Boss"), following his return from India with seven Indian boys, six of whom were princes. The school started in the mansion built and originally owned by the Clark family, who owned and ran the shoe manufacturer Clarks.

Meyer, educated at Haileybury and Imperial Service College, adhered to the philanthropic aim, known at the school as The Millfield Mix:  "...to nurture talent by providing the very best facilities, teaching, coaching and opportunities in which young people can exercise and explore their abilities; and to give awards to those in financial need."

In 1939, the school became one of the first independent schools to become co-educational. Over the years, the school acquired land and houses around the locale, and as a result there were many boarding houses within a 10-mile (16-kilometre) radius of the original site; this resulted in boarders living at houses or billets in the outlying villages – being bussed in and out for lessons and meals. The girls' boarding house was at Ashcott House from 1967 until 1984.

Over recent years, many of these houses have been sold and the proceeds invested in new on-campus boarding houses. There are currently three remaining country boarding houses occupied by male pupils.

In the 1990s the school gained a reputation for drug and alcohol use among the pupils and a teacher was charged with assaulting a female pupil. In response, the school says that it takes a pragmatic approach to dealing with these problems; the school offers drugs counselling where appropriate, and for periodical visits to the school by police officers with sniffer dogs. Any pupils who are found with any illegal substances are immediately expelled.

In 2005 the school was one of fifty independent schools which were found guilty of running an illegal price-fixing cartel, exposed by The Times, which had allowed them to drive up fees for thousands of parents. Each school was required to pay a nominal penalty of £10,000 and all agreed to make ex-gratia payments totalling £3 million into a trust designed to benefit pupils who attended the schools during the period in respect of which fee information was shared.

In 2018, the school made national news when allegations of bullying arose after a student reported that Year 10 pupils were beaten with cricket bats and belts for an initiation ceremony. After the parent of the student reported these allegations to the headmaster, an investigation was conducted and two pupils were suspended. Headmaster Gavin Horgan said: “I believe passionately in pupils having a voice and their wellbeing continues to be our top priority. Our rigorous safeguarding procedures mean any concerns that arise at school are dealt with quickly, transparently and fairly.” According to a Freedom of Information request the school left  the Teacher’s Pension Scheme on the 31st August 2021.

Houses 
Millfield is predominantly a boarding school, having around 75% of its pupils as boarders. The school operates a house system, which is based on sex and status as a day pupil or boarder. With the introduction of 'Nine at Millfield' in 2014, Year 9 is now treated as a transitional year with the school having 'Year 9 only' day and boarding houses. All of the other houses are Years 10–13 boarders, and two are exclusively for Sixth Formers (i.e. Years 12 and 13). The boarding houses are supervised by house parents, assisted by assistant house parents, tutors, and matrons. Each house generally has around 40 to 50 pupils.

There are fourteen boys' and nine girls' houses; the oldest house is Millfield House, which is the original building in which the school first began operating. The house opened when the school was established in 1935 and is now one of Year 9 boarding houses. The house used to be the mansion of the Clark family, whose shoe business, C. & J. Clark, is based in the town.

 Girls

 Boys

Sports 
Millfield is known for its sporting prowess and has produced many international and Olympic athletes; its campus houses a wide range of sports facilities. 130 staff sports coaches oversee the 29 different sports on offer, including athletics, badminton, basketball, chess, clay shooting, cricket, cross country, dance, equestrian, fencing, football, golf, hockey, karate, modern pentathlon, netball, outdoor activities, rowing, rugby, ski racing, squash, swimming, tennis, trampolining and triathlon.

Olympic Games 
Millfield has been represented at every Olympic Games since 1956.  At the London 2012 Games, Millfield was the most represented UK school.  At the Rio Games in 2016, eight Millfieldians took part and won a total of four medals in rowing, swimming and rugby sevens.

Millfield has an indoor and outdoor riding arena and golf courses, as well as a 50 metre swimming pool, which appeared as a venue in the official London 2012 Pre-Games Training Camp Guide. The Russian swimming team used the school as its training base before the London Olympics, and the Great Britain modern pentathlon squad also used the school's facilities in preparation for the games.

Preparatory School

Millfield Preparatory School is a coeducational preparatory school in Glastonbury and is the feeder for the senior school. Currently there are 442 pupils attending the school, 231 boys and 211 girls. 146 of the pupils are boarders and 296 are day pupils.

History 
The school was founded in 1946, by Jack 'Boss' Meyer who also founded and ran Millfield and later became the headteacher. He bought Edgarley Hall and its grounds from the Thomas-Ferrands, following use by the army in World War II.

Meyer's philosophy was "...to nurture talent by providing the very best facilities, teaching, coaching and opportunities in which young people can exercise and explore their abilities; and to give awards to those in financial need."

A pre-preparatory department was initially started at the 19th-century house, The Hollies, in the centre of Glastonbury in the mid-1980s, later moving to the main preparatory school site.

Academics
The curriculum includes English, mathematics, sciences, design and technology, information and communications technology, history, geography, religious studies, modern languages, arts, music, drama and media studies and chess. Extracurricular activities include sport, music and 80 clubs.

The Learning Development Centre (LDC) is staffed by four full-time and two part-time members of staff to support pupils who have identified learning difficulties, including dyslexia.

Boarding
Around 43% of pupils are boarders. Boarding has been an integral part of the school for most of its history. There are three boys' boarding houses and two girls' houses, each housing between 30 and 40 pupils. Flexi-boarding is also available.

Sport
There are 24 sports on offer and over 70 co-curricular activities. Sports facilities include: a 50m swimming pool, an equestrian centre, sports halls, cricket nets, putting green, squash courts, Astro-turf hockey pitch, outdoor tennis courts, netball courts and a 9-hole golf course.

Chapel
The school chapel was opened in 1897 as a mission church serving Edgarley.

Notable former masters
John le Carré, author and secret service operative

Headmasters 
 1935–1971 Jack 'Boss' Meyer
 1971–1986 Colin Atkinson
 1986–1990 Brian Gaskell
 1990–1998 Christopher Martin
 1998–2008 Peter Johnson
 2008–2018 Craig Considine
 2018– Gavin Horgan

Notable alumni 

 Anthony Allen - England rugby union player
 Lily Allen, singer 
 Romeo Beckham, professional footballer and model
 Tony Blackburn, radio DJ
 Andrew Castle, tennis player and GMTV presenter
 Jason Connery, actor
 Sophie Dahl, international fashion model
 Wesley Durston, county cricketer
 Ella Eyre, singer-songwriter
 Gareth Forwood, British stage, film and television actor
 David Graveney, Chairman of England cricket selectors
 Aftab Habib, England international cricketer
 Adam Hastings, rugby union player for Gloucester and Scotland.
 James Hildreth former Somerset cricketer
 Ben Hollioake, England cricket international
 Huw Jones, Scottish rugby union player
 Simon Jones, England and Glamorgan cricketer
 Jonathan Joseph, England and Bath professional rugby union player
 Ruth Kelly, Secretary of State for Communities and Local Government and Minister for Women. MP for Bolton
 Ömer Koç, Turkish billionaire, chairman of Koç Holding
 Craig Kieswetter, England and Somerset cricketer
 Rose Leslie, actress
 David Luckes, hockey international and member of British Olympic Committee
 Ghislaine Maxwell, socialite and convicted child sex trafficker
 Tyrone Mings, Aston Villa FC and England footballer
 Max Mosley, former president of the FIA
 Lando Norris, Formula One driver
 Matthew Perry, England rugby international
 Chris Robshaw, Captain of England national rugby union team
 Rhys Ruddock, professional rugby union player for Leinster and Ireland
Callum Sheedy, Rugby Union player, Bristol Bears & Wales 
 Padmanabh Singh,Titular Maharaja of Jaipur
 Yvonne Tobis (born 1948), Israeli Olympic swimmer
 Vajiralongkorn, the King of Thailand
 Mako Vunipola, Saracens and England rugby player
 Ben Wallace, Secretary of State for Defence and Conservative MP for Wyre and Preston North
 Chris Wickham, historian of the early Middle Ages

Images

Arms

References

External links 

 Millfield School website
 Prep school website
 Profile on the Independent Schools Council website
Prep school profile
 Millfield School at CricketArchive
 Millfield School at Cricinfo

1935 establishments in England
Boarding schools in Somerset
Cricket grounds in Somerset
Educational institutions established in 1935
Private schools in Somerset
Member schools of the Headmasters' and Headmistresses' Conference
Street, Somerset